Marija Vojskovič (25 October 1915 – 1997) was a Slovene writer, best known for her short stories and semi-autobiographical writing.

Vojskovič was born in Ljubljana in 1915. Her family had just moved there from Trieste after the outbreak of the First World War. She wrote short stories and articles published in numerous journals and magazines.

She won the Levstik Award for her book Hiša številka 15 (House Number 15) in 1989.

Published works

 Tržačani (People from Trieste), 1986 
 Mi smo od tam … (We Come From There ...), 1986 
 Hiša št. 15 (House Number 15), 1988
 Ženski zaliv (Women's Bay), 1992 
 Ljubi znanci (Dear Aquantances), 1995
 V volčji koži (In the Wolf's Skin), 1997
 Ajčkin čas (Ajčka's Time), 1997 posthumously

References

Slovenian women writers
Slovenian children's writers
1915 births
1997 deaths
Writers from Ljubljana
Levstik Award laureates
Slovenian women children's writers
20th-century Slovenian women writers
20th-century Slovenian writers
Yugoslav writers